Falls of Cruachan railway station is a railway station located at the foot of Ben Cruachan in Scotland. This station is on the Oban branch of the West Highland Line, originally part of the Callander and Oban Railway. It is sited between Taynuilt and Loch Awe, sited  from Callander via Glen Ogle. ScotRail manage the station and operate all services.

History 

The station (on the lower slopes of Ben Cruachan, above Loch Awe) opened on 1 October 1893 with a single platform, but was later closed on 1 November 1965.

Reopening

The station was reopened on 20 June 1988.

Signalling 
Although Falls of Cruachan station has never had any signalling directly associated with it, its platform falls within the four mile stretch of railway that is protected by the Pass of Brander stone signals.

Accidents and incidents 

The area near the station has been the site of five derailments due to the rock fall: in 1881, 1946, 1997, and in 2010, which proved the most significant.

On 6 June 2010, a two carriage train from Glasgow to  derailed near Falls of Cruachan station. The train derailed shortly before 8.53 p.m. and was left balanced precariously on a  embankment. There was also a minor fire. Sixty passengers had been on board the train, but all were safely evacuated down the line to the station with no major injuries. Nine people were injured. The train hit a boulder that had fallen onto the track. The train crew later received a commendation for the actions they took to protect their passengers.

Facilities 
The station has no facilities bar an electronic display and a bench. Surprisingly, there is no car park or drop-off point, as the only entrance is directly off the A85. The station does not have step-free access. As there are no facilities to purchase tickets, passengers must buy one in advance, or from the guard on the train. Notably, as the station does not have lighting, trains cannot call between dusk and dawn.

Passenger volume 

The statistics cover twelve month periods that start in April.

Services 
All services at Falls of Cruachan are operated by ScotRail. However, unlike other stations on the line, the station is only open in the summer months from March to October every year. This is because the station is mainly used by hikers in the summer months, who walk past the falls to climb Ben Cruachan.

References

Bibliography

External links

Video footage of Falls of Cruachan railway station

Railway stations in Argyll and Bute
Railway stations in Great Britain opened in 1893
Railway stations in Great Britain closed in 1965
Railway stations in Great Britain opened in 1988
Railway stations served by ScotRail
Low usage railway stations in the United Kingdom
Beeching closures in Scotland
Former Caledonian Railway stations
Reopened railway stations in Great Britain